The Michael Schenker Group (often abbreviated as MSG) are a guitar-oriented hard rock band, formed in London in 1979 by former Scorpions and UFO guitarist Michael Schenker. In 1986, Schenker and vocalist Robin McAuley formed the McAuley Schenker Group, which lasted until 1993. Afterwards, in 1996, the Michael Schenker Group was reformed. After the release of their second live album, 1984's Rock Will Never Die, its members began to have serious discussions that caused a two-year hiatus, and Michael ended the band in 1986. 

The group has repeatedly expressed an excellent interpretation, generated by the technique of its leader, representing one of the cornerstones of the history of hard rock. Their symbol is a Flying V, half black and half white, an instrument that has always captured Schenker's imagination. In the history of the band, dozens of musicians have passed through including keyboardists, rhythmic guitarists, drummers, bassists and vocalists.

History
The band was formed in 1979, following the breakup of Michael Schenker from UFO, in an attempt to have a band that better suited his needs. He therefore decided to move to London; a few weeks after his arrival in the British capital, he joined Gary Barden, vocalist of Fraser Nash, who, with bassist Billy Sheehan and drummer Denny Carmassi founded a new band, simply called Michael Schenker Group. The following year they recorded their second album, MSG, which placed at No. 14 on the UK charts. During their promotional tour, they played at Tokyo's Nippon Budokan in Japan, where their first live album was recorded titled One Night at Budokan. It was released in 1982 with great success in the UK where it was certified silver after exceeding 60,000 copies sold.

In October 1983, the band released Built to Destroy, the first with keyboardist Andy Nye and which also featured Derek St. Holmes, known at the time as Ted Nugent's vocalist. To promote it, they gave several concerts in the UK and later went on tour to other European countries as the opening band of Iron Maiden. Their farewell concert was held on December 18, 1983 at the Dortmund festival, after which the band disbanded, and the guitarist founded the McAuley Schenker Group.

After deciding to wrap up the McAuley Schenker Group project, Schenker decided to re-found the band in 1996 with Leif Sundin on vocals, Barry Sparks on bass and Shane Gaalaas on drums with whom he recorded Written in the Sand. Two years later, they released The Unforgiven, with Kelly Keeling replacing Sundin and with John Onder replacing Sparks.

Discography

Studio albums

Michael Schenker Group 
 The Michael Schenker Group (1980) #8 UK
 MSG (1981)
 Assault Attack (1982)
 Built to Destroy (1983)
 Written in the Sand (1996) #22 Japan
 The Unforgiven (1999)
 Be Aware of Scorpions (2001)
 Arachnophobiac (2003)
 Tales of Rock'n'Roll (2006)
 In the Midst of Beauty (2008)
Immortal (2021)
Universal (2022)

McAuley Schenker Group 
 Perfect Timing (1987)
 Save Yourself (1989)
 M.S.G. (1991)
 Nightmare: The Acoustic M.S.G. (1992)
Schenker Barden Acoustic Project

 Gipsy Lady (2009)

Schenker's Temple of Rock 
 Temple of Rock (2011)
 Bridge the Gap (2013)
 Spirit on a Mission (2015)

Michael Schenker Fest 
 Resurrection (2018)
 Revelation (2019)

Cover albums

Michael Schenker Group 
 Heavy Hitters (2005)
 Doctor Doctor: The Kulick Sessions (2007 re-release)
 By Invitation Only (2011 re-release)

Live albums
Michael Schenker Group
 One Night at Budokan (1982) (UK Silver)
 Rock Will Never Die (1984)
 BBC Radio 1 Live in Concert (1993)
 The Michael Schenker Story Live (1997)
 The Unforgiven World Tour (1999)
 The Mad Axeman Live (2007)
 Walk the Stage: The Official Bootleg Box Set (2009)
 The 30th Anniversary Concert: Live in Tokyo (2010)

McAuley Schenker Group 
 "Unplugged" Live (1992)

Schenker's Temple of Rock 
 On a Mission - Live in Europe (2012)
 On a Mission - Live in Madrid (2016)

Michael Schenker Fest 
 Live Tokyo International Forum Hall A (2017)

Band members 

Current members
 Michael Schenker – lead and rhythm guitar, live and occasional studio backing vocals 
 Steve Mann – keyboards, rhythm and occasional lead guitar, backing vocals 
 Bodo Schopf – drums 
 Ronnie Romero – lead vocals 
 Barend Courbois – bass guitar, backing vocals

References

External links

 Michael Schenker official site
 
 MSG in the BNR metal pages

Musical groups from London
Musical groups established in 1979
British heavy metal musical groups
British hard rock musical groups
Metal Mind Productions artists
Chrysalis Records artists
New Wave of British Heavy Metal musical groups